The men's 4 × 100 metre freestyle relay event at the 11th FINA World Swimming Championships (25m) took place 12 December 2012 at the Sinan Erdem Dome.

Records
Prior to this competition, the existing world and championship records were as follows.

The following records were established during the competition:

Results

Heats
19 teams participated in 3 heats.

Final

The final was held at 20:26.

References

External links
 2012 FINA World Swimming Championships (25 m): Men's 4 x 100 metre freestyle entry list, from OmegaTiming.com.

Freestyle relay 4x100 metre, Men's
World Short Course Swimming Championships